The Central Illinois District is one of the 35 districts of the Lutheran Church–Missouri Synod (LCMS), and covers the middle third of the state of Illinois; the rest of the state is divided between the Northern Illinois District and the Southern Illinois District. The Central Illinois District includes approximately 159 congregations and missions, subdivided into 16 circuits, as well as 30 preschools, 23 elementary schools and 3 high schools. Baptized membership in district congregations is over 64,000.

The Central Illinois District was formed in 1907 when the Illinois District was divided. District offices are located in the state capital, Springfield, Illinois.  Delegates from each congregation meet in convention every three years to elect the district president, vice presidents, circuit counselors, a board of directors, and other officers.  The Rev. Mark A. Miller became the district president in 2012.

Presidents
Rev. Frederick Brand, 1907–17
Rev. Fred William Brockmann, 1917–18
Rev. August Friedrich Wilhelm Heyne, 1918–27
Rev. P. Schulz, 1927–32
Rev. Philip Wilhelm, 1932–33
Rev. Walter Ernest Hohenstein, 1933–35
Rev. John Carl Schuelke, 1935–42
Rev. Albert Otto Carl Bernthal, 1942–48
Rev. Emil Frederick Tonn, 1948–54
Rev. Alvin W. Mueller, 1954–63
Rev. Lewis C. Niemoeller, 1963–70
Rev. Rudolph A. Haak, 1970–74
Rev. Arthur T. Kuehnert, 1974–85
Rev. Robert T. Kuhn, 1985–95
Rev. David J. Bueltmann, 1995–2012
Rev. Mark A. Miller, 2012–present

References

External links
Central Illinois District web site
LCMS: Central Illinois District
LCMS Congregation Directory

Lutheran Church–Missouri Synod districts
Lutheranism in Illinois
Christian organizations established in 1907
1907 establishments in Illinois